Upsilon Leonis (υ Leo) is a star in the zodiac constellation of Leo. It is visible to the naked eye with an apparent visual magnitude of 4.33. The distance to this star, as determined using parallax measurements, is about 182 light years. At that distance, the visual magnitude of the star is diminished by an estimated extinction factor of 0m.02 because of interstellar dust.

With an age of around 4 billion years, this star has evolved into a G-type giant star with a stellar classification of G9 III. It has 2.6 times the Sun's mass, but has expanded to 11 times the solar radius and shines with 56 times the luminosity of the Sun at an effective temperature of 4,842 K. The rate of rotation is too small to be measured, with a projected rotational velocity of 0.0 km/s. The chemical abundance of elements other than hydrogen and helium, what astronomers term the star's metallicity, is less than half that in the Sun. It is most likely a member of the galactic thin disk population.

Planetary system
In 2021, a gas giant planet was detected by radial velocity method.

References

G-type giants
Leo (constellation)
Leonis, Upsilon
Leonis, 91
100920
0055945
4471
BD−00 2458
Planetary systems with one confirmed planet